Delhi has a long history, and has been an important political centre of India as the capital of several empires. Earliest coverage of Delhi's history is in the onset of the Tomar's kingdom in the 8th century.  It is considered to be a city built, destroyed and rebuilt several times, as outsiders who successfully invaded the Indian subcontinent would ransack the existing capital city in Delhi, and those who came to conquer and stay would be so impressed by the city's strategic location as to make it their capital and rebuild it in their own way.

In the medieval era, Delhi was ruled by the Tomara dynasty and Chauhan from 736 to 1193. The Delhi Sultanate is the name given for a series of five successive dynasties, which remained as a dominant power of Indian subcontinent with Delhi as their capital.

During Sultanate period, the city became a center for culture. The Delhi Sultanate came to an end in 1526, when Babur defeated the forces of the last Lodi sultan, Ibrahim Lodi at the first Battle of Panipat, and formed the Mughal Empire.

The Mughals ruled the area for three centuries. During the 16th century, the city declined as the Mughal capital was shifted. The fifth Mughal Emperor Shah Jahan built the walled city of Shahjahanabad within Delhi, and its landmarks, the Red Fort and Jama Masjid. His reign would be considered the zenith of the empire. After the death of his successor Aurangzeb, the Mughal Empire was plagued by a series of revolts. They lost major portions to the Marathas, Sikhs and many governors of erstwhile Mughal provinces like Bengal, Awadh and Hyderabad. Delhi was sacked and looted by Nader Shah. The Jats captured many important towns of Mughal heartland south of Delhi.  The Marathas captured Delhi in the battle of Delhi in 1757 and continued to control it until 1803  when they were defeated by the British during the second Anglo-Maratha War. In 1803, Delhi was captured by the British East India Company.

During Company Rule in India, the Mughal Emperor Bahadur Shah II was reduced to merely a figurehead. The Indian Rebellion of 1857 sought to end company rule and declared Bahadur Shah II the Emperor of India. However, the British soon recaptured Delhi and their other territories, ending the short-lived rebellion. This also marked the beginning of direct British Rule in India. In 1911, the capital of British India was shifted from Calcutta to New Delhi, the last inner city of Delhi designed by Edwin Lutyens.

After India's Independence from the British, New Delhi became the capital of the newly formed Republic of India.

Mention in epics

A long-standing tradition associates Delhi with Indraprastha and identifies the legendary city with the village Indarpat, which survived until the early 20th century within the Purana Qila. There is no tangible archeological evidence, however, which links the excavated 'painted greyware' at Purana Qila with the Bharata Khanda site.The legendary ancient city of Indraprastha is mentioned in the ancient Indian epic Mahabharata probably compiled between the 3rd century BCE and the 3rd century CE, with the oldest preserved parts not much older than around 400 BCE. 

There was Ochre Coloured Pottery culture in Red fort area which began around c.2000 BCE according to carbon dating. Around c.1200 BCE the region was inhabited by people of Painted Grey Ware culture which corresponds to Vedic Period. Significant prehistoric sites in Delhi include Anangpur (in the Badarpur region), as well as Harappan excavations near Narela and Nand Nagari.

Medieval period

Tomaras 

Anangpal Tomar founded Delhi in 1052. A VS 1383 inscription in Delhi Museum confirms the founding of Delhi by the Tomars.

He established the Tomar Dynasty of Delhi in the early 8th century and built his capital at the Anangpur village in Haryana. The Anangpur Dam was built during his reign; the Surajkund during the reign of his son Surajpal.

Chauhan 

The Rajput Chahamana (Chauhan) kings of Ajmer conquered Lal Kot in 1180 and renamed it Qila Rai Pithora. The Chauhan king Prithviraj III was defeated in 1192 by Muhammad Ghori in the Second Battle of Tarain, solidifying Muslim presence in northern India and shattering Rajput power in the Indo-Gangetic Plain.

Late Medieval period (13th-16th centuries CE)

Delhi Sultanate 

From 1206, Delhi became the capital of the Delhi Sultanate under the Slave Dynasty. The first Sultan of Delhi, Qutb-ud-din Aybak, was a former slave who rose through the ranks to become a general, a governor and then Sultan of Delhi. Qutb-ud-din started the construction of the Qutub Minar, a recognisable symbol of Delhi, to commemorate his victory but died before its completion. In the Qutb complex he also constructed the Quwwat-al-Islam (might of Islam), which is the earliest extant mosque in India. He was said to have destroyed twenty-seven Jain temples initially housed in the Qutb complex and pillaged exquisitely carved pillars and building material from their debris for this mosque, many of which can still be seen. After the end of the Slave dynasty, a succession of Turkic Central Asian and Afghan dynasties, the Khalji dynasty, the Tughluq dynasty, the Sayyid dynasty and the Lodi dynasty held power in the late medieval period and built a sequence of forts and townships in Delhi.

Timur 

In 1398, Timur Lang invaded India on the pretext that the Muslim sultans of Delhi were too tolerant of their Hindu subjects. After defeating the armies of Nasiruddin Mahmud of Tughlaq dynasty, on 15 December 1398, Timur entered Delhi on 18 December 1398, and the city was sacked, destroyed, and left in ruins, and over 100,000 war prisoners were killed as well.

Defeat of the Lodi sultans 

In 1526, following the First Battle of Panipat, Zahiruddin Babur, the former ruler of Fergana, defeated the last Afghan Lodi sultan and founded the Mughal dynasty which ruled from Delhi, Agra and Lahore.

Early Modern period (16th-18th centuries CE)
The early modern period in Indian history is marked with the rise of the Mughal Empire between the 16th and 18th centuries. After the fall of the Delhi Sultanate, the Mughals ruled from Agra, Sikri and Lahore, but the city once became the capital in 1648 during the rule of Shah Jahan, and remained the capital until the fall of the empire. During this time, Delhi became a center for culture, and poets such as Ghalib, Dard, Dagh and Zauq lived in the city and sought patronage of the emperor. The Mughals also built several monuments in the city including Humayun's Tomb, Red Fort, and Jama Masjid.

Babur and Humayun (1526–1556) 

The first Mughal Emperors Babur (1526-1530) and Humayun (1530-1540, restored 1556-57) ruled from Agra, unlike the preceding Delhi Sultans.

In the mid-16th century there was an interruption in the Mughal rule of India as Sher Shah Suri defeated Humayun and forced him to flee to Persia. Sher Shah Suri built the sixth city of Delhi, as well as the old fort known as Purana Qila, even though this city was settled since the ancient era. After Sher Shah Suri's death in 1545, his son Islam Shah took the reins of north India from Delhi. Islam Shah ruled from Delhi.  Then Humayun was briefly restored; but meanwhile in 1553 the Hindu Hemu became the Prime Minister and Chief of Army of Adil Shah. 

Hemu fought and won 22 battles in all against rebels and (twice) against the Mughal Akbar's army in Agra and Delhi, without losing any. After defeating Akbar's army on 7 October 1556 at Tughlaqabad fort area in Battle of Delhi, Hemu acceded to Delhi throne and established Hindu Raj in North India for a brief period, taking the title 'Vikramaditya' at his coronation in Purana Quila, Delhi. Hemu was defeated at the second battle of Panipat by Mughal forces led by Akbar's regent Bairam Khan, thus reinstating Mughal rule in the region.

Akbar to Aurangzeb (1556–1707) 

The third and greatest Mughal emperor, Akbar (1556-1605), continued to rule from Agra, resulting in a decline in the fortunes of Delhi. 

In the mid-17th century, the Mughal Emperor Shah Jahan (1628–1658) built the city that sometimes bears his name Shahjahanabad, the seventh city of Delhi that is now commonly known as the old city or old Delhi. This city contains a number of significant architectural features, including the Red Fort (Lal Qila) and the Jama Masjid. The city served as the capital of the later Mughal Empire from 1638 onward, when Shah Jahan transferred the capital back from Agra.

Aurangzeb (1658–1707) crowned himself as emperor in Delhi in 1658 at the Shalimar garden ('Aizzabad-Bagh) with a second coronation in 1659. 

After 1680, the Mughal Empire's influence declined rapidly as the Hindu Maratha Empire rose to prominence.

Decline of Mughals and rise of Marathas 

The Mughal Empire suffered several blows due to invasions from Marathas, Jats, Afghans and Sikhs. In 1737, Bajirao I marched towards Delhi with a huge army. The Marathas defeated the Mughals in the First Battle of Delhi. The Maratha forces sacked Delhi following their victory against the Mughals. In 1739, the Mughal Empire lost the huge Battle of Karnal in less than three hours against the numerically outnumbered but military superior Persian army led by Nader Shah during his invasion after which he completely sacked and looted Delhi, the Mughal capital, followed by massacre for 2 days, killing over 30,000 civilians and carrying away immense wealth including the Peacock Throne, the Daria-i-Noor, and Koh-i-Noor. Nader eventually agreed to leave the city and India after forcing the Mughal emperor Muhammad Shah I to beg him for mercy and granting him the keys of the city and the royal treasury. A treaty signed in 1752 made Marathas the protector of the Mughal throne at Delhi. In 1753 Jat ruler Suraj Mal attacked Delhi. He defeated Nawab of Delhi Ghazi-ud-din (second) and captured Delhi in the Capture of Delhi. Jats sacked Delhi from 9 May to 4 June. Ahmad Shah Durrani invaded North India for the fourth time in early 1757. He entered Delhi in January 1757 and kept the Mughal emperor under arrest. In August 1757, the Marathas once again attacked Delhi, decisively defeating Najib-ud-Daula and his Rohilla Afghan army in the Battle of Delhi (1757). Later, Ahmad Shah Durrani conquered Delhi in 1761, after the Third Battle of Panipat in which the Marathas were decisively defeated. Later, a treaty was made between the Marathas and Afghans that the Marathas would have all the lands east of the Sutlej river. Thus, the Marathas established full control over the city. Under the leadership of Jassa Singh Ahluwalia and Baghel Singh, Delhi was briefly conquered by the Sikh Empire in early 1783 in the Battle of Delhi (1783).

Colonial period (19th-20th centuries CE)

Company rule 

In 1803, during the Second Anglo-Maratha War, the forces of British East India Company defeated the Maratha forces in the Battle of Delhi (1803), ending the Maratha rule over the city. As a result, Delhi came under the control of British East India Company, and became a part of the North-Western Provinces. The Mughal Emperor Shah Alam II remained a mere figurehead.

Revolt of 1857 

The Indian Rebellion of 1857 sought to end Company Rule in India. On 11 May, the mutineers reached and captured Delhi, and declared Bahadur Shah Zafar II the Emperor of India, and the Emperor held his first court in many years. However, the British returned and laid siege to Delhi on 8 June 1857. On 21 September, Delhi finally fell into the hands of British troops. The city received significant damage during the battle. Afterwards, the last titular Mughal Emperor Bahadur Shah Zafar II was captured and exiled to Rangoon.

Delhi passed into the direct control of British Government in 1857 after the Indian Rebellion of 1857 and the remaining Mughal territories were annexed as a part of British India.

British Raj 

Calcutta was the capital of British India till 1911 but in 1911 at the Delhi Durbar of 1911, held at the Coronation Park, King George V announced the shifting of the capital to Delhi. New Delhi designed by the British architect Edwin Lutyens was inaugurated in 1931 after its construction was delayed due to World War I. New Delhi was officially declared as the seat of the Government of India after independence in 1947.

Post-Independence (1947–present) 
During the partition of India, around five lakh Hindu and Sikh refugees, mainly from West Punjab fled to Delhi, while around three lakh Muslim residents of the city migrated to Pakistan. Ethnic Punjabis are believed to account for at least 40% of Delhi's total population and are predominantly Hindi-speaking Punjabi Hindus. Migration to Delhi from the rest of India continues, contributing more to the rise of Delhi's population than the birth rate, which is declining.

The States Reorganisation Act, 1956 created the Union Territory of Delhi from its predecessor, the Chief Commissioner's Province of Delhi.
The Constitution (Sixty-ninth Amendment) Act, 1991 declared the Union Territory of Delhi to be formally known as the National Capital Territory of Delhi. The Act gave Delhi its own legislative assembly along Civil lines, though with limited powers.

After 1967 relations between Hindus and Muslims deteriorated to the level that there was a significant uptick in the number of riots and other disruption of civil life. One of the most significant was the 1973 riot in Bao Hindu Rao area, which resulted in the injury of 18 police officers and financial losses estimated to be around 500,000 Rupees, according to police sources. Another significant riot happened on 5 May 1974 in the Sadar Bazar area between Hindus and Muslims in which 11 people were killed and 92 were injured. This riot was the worst in Delhi since independence. The Centre for the Study of Developing Societies carried out a survey in nearby areas that showed significant division between Hindus and Muslims who saw each other negatively.

In 1966, an inscription of the Mauryan Emperor Ashoka (273-236 BCE) was discovered near Sriniwaspuri. Two sandstone pillars inscribed with the edicts of Ashoka were brought to by Firuz Shah Tughluq in the 14th century already exist in Delhi.

See also
 Agrasen ki Baoli
 Gates of Delhi
 Mehrauli Archaeological Park

References

Bibliography

External links
 Delhi (1938), a documentary by BFI archives
 
 Land and Acquisition Act of 1894, under which the new city of Delhi was acquired
 The agreement of construction of new city of Delhi with original signatures of Herbert Baker and Edwin Luteyns

 
New Delhi

cy:Hen Ddelhi